How Do I Become Rich and Happy? is a 1930 German musical film directed by Max Reichmann and starring Georgia Lind, Hugo Schrader, and Ilse Korseck. It was made by Bavaria Film at the Emelka Studios near Munich. The film's art direction was by Hans Jacoby.

Cast

References

Bibliography

External links 
 

1930 films
Films of the Weimar Republic
German musical films
1930 musical films
1930s German-language films
Films directed by Max Reichmann
Bavaria Film films
Films shot at Bavaria Studios
German black-and-white films
1930s German films